According to the Book of Mormon, Lachoneus  was the chief judge of the Nephites during the time of the birth of Christ, or AD 1, the 92nd year of the reign of the judges. His reign started at a date unknown but not earlier than about 23-20 BC, the approximate time of the assassination of chief judge Cezoram.

No record of his life prior to the year AD 16 exists. In this year Giddianhi, leader of the band of Gadianton robbers at the time, sent Lachoneus a letter demanding that the Nephites surrender or be destroyed. Lachoneus rejected the demands and began preparations for war. He commanded his people to gather together in one place and there build fortifications against the robbers, appointed captains including Gidgiddoni, "great commander all the armies of the Nephites." Both Lachoneus and Gidgiddoni were great prophets, and both preached repentance to the Nephites. The people accepted the leadership and counsel of these two great prophet-leaders, and the Nephites were eventually victorious.

Lachoneus died about AD 30 and was succeeded by his son, also named Lachoneus.

Lachoneus II, son of Lachoneus
Lachoneus II, son of the above Lachoneus, succeeded his father as chief judge. He reigned for one year before the king-men assassinated him as part of an attempt to establish a monarchy. The monarchy was never established nor a new judge instated; the central government instead crumbled to be replaced by a tribal structure.

Lachoneus II is the last Nephite ruler specifically identified in the Book of Mormon.

References

Book of Mormon people